Kawkab Sabah al-Daya is a former Minister of State for Environment Affairs for Syria.

Early life, education and career
Al-Daya was born in the Banias in 1962. She earned a pharmacy degree and a doctorate from the University of Damascus. She was a professor at the University of Damascus, appointed Associate Minister of Health in 1993, and Director of Health, Environment and Population Bureau in the General Federation of Women. She was appointed the first Minister of State for Environment Affairs on 23 April 2009, the day after Earth Day.

Personal life
Al-Daya is married and has three children.

See also
Cabinet of Syria

References

Minister of State for Environment Affairs Kawkab Sabah al-Daya, SANA
Biography of the new Syrian government 2011 - the names and lives of government ministers, Syria FM, 17 April 2011

Living people
Damascus University alumni
Syrian ministers of state
1962 births
Arab Socialist Ba'ath Party – Syria Region politicians